When It Was Done is an album by Brazilian keyboardist Walter Wanderley featuring performances recorded in 1968 and released on the CTI label.

Reception

The Allmusic by Richard S. Ginell stated "The Wanderley sound is more carefully terraced than ever on this strikingly packaged album".

Track listing
 "Open Your Arms (Let Me Walk Right In)" (Raymond B. Evans) - 2:39 
 "Surfboard" (Antônio Carlos Jobim) - 2:35 
 "Baiao Da Garoa" (Luiz Gonzaga) - 3:39 
 "Reach Out for Me" (Burt Bacharach, Hal David) - 2:41 
 "Ole, Ole, Ola" (Chico Buarque de Hollanda) - 2:30 
 "Ponteio" (Edu Lobo, José Carlos Capinam) - 2:30 
 "When It Was Done" (Jimmy Webb) - 2:24 
 "On My Mind" (Eumir Deodato, Norman Gimbel) - 2:47 
 "Just My Love and I" (Deodato, J. Spencer) - 2:21 
 "Capoeira" (Deodato) - 4:22 
 "Truth in Peace" (Durval Ferreira) - 2:34 
Recorded at Van Gelder Studio in Englewood Cliffs, New Jersey on December 11, 12 & 13, 1968

Personnel
Walter Wanderley - organ, electronic harpsichord
Marvin Stamm, John Glasel - flugelhorn
George Marge, Stan Webb - flute, piccolo
Donald Ashworth, Hubert Laws - flute, piccolo, oboe, English horn
José Marino - bass
João Palma - drums
Lu Lu Ferreira - percussion
Lewis Eley, Harry Glickman, Gene Orloff, Raoul Poliakin, Max Pollikoff, Matthew Raimondi, Tosha Samaroff, Sylvan Shulman, Avram Weiss - violin
Harold Coletta, Harold Furmansky - viola
Charles McCracken, George Ricci - cello
Gloria Agostini - harp
Anamaria Valle, Marilyn Jackson, Linda November, Milton Nascimento - vocals
Eumir Deodato - rhythm arrangements
Don Sebesky - string arrangements

References

CTI Records albums
Walter Wanderley albums
1969 albums
Albums produced by Creed Taylor
Albums arranged by Don Sebesky
Albums recorded at Van Gelder Studio